Fredrick William Frame (June 3, 1894 – April 25, 1962) was an American race car driver. One of the leading AAA Championship Car drivers of the late 1920s and early 1930s, Frame is best remembered for his victory at the 1932 Indianapolis 500.

Biography

Early career

Frederick William Frame, commonly known by the nickname "Fred," was born June 3, 1894, in Exeter, New Hampshire.

Frame relocated to Los Angeles, California, where he began dirt track racing in about 1922. On July 5, 1923, Frame set his first world record in San Luis Obispo, California, driving a mile on a dirt track in 43.4 seconds. Frame's record mile, established in a non-competitive event, surpassed the previous record for a dirt track mile of 45 seconds, held by Barney Oldfield of St. Louis since August 1917.

By 1924, Frame was running his own car on the dirt track at Culver City, California, finishing second in a 100-mile race held there on July 5. Frame also continued to race on dirt tracks and began to venture outside of California in 1926, escaping serious injury in a crash in September of that year in a five-mile race in Abilene, Texas, held in conjunction with the West Texas Fair. A Texas racer was less fortunate, being killed in the same race when his car went through a railing and rolled.

Indianapolis 500

Frame began running at the Indianapolis 500, held in Indianapolis, Indiana, in 1927. In that year he drove a machine owned by George Fernic, finishing in 11th place. He was brought back in 1928 by car owner Bill White to drive the same Duesenberg which had won the race the previous year. Frame would finish in 8th place in that race.

In 1929, Frame arrived in Indianapolis just four days ahead of the race to drive a Cooper Special Front Drive. Despite limited practice time, Frame was able to qualify the car at over 111 miles per hour and sat in second place at the halfway point of the race, which was started by 33 cars on a quest for a share of $100,000 in prize money. He would finish in 10th place, after leading the race for 11 laps — receiving bonus prize money of $100 per lap led provided by race sponsors.

Frame would race at Indianapolis eight times in all, including a second-place finish in the 1931 race.

1932 Indy 500 victory

Frame's greatest career victory was a win in the 1932 Indianapolis 500 on May 31, 1932. Driving a tan Müler-Hartz front wheel drive machine, the 10-year racing veteran Frame finished the course in 4 hours, 48 minutes, 3.79 seconds. Frame dueled fellow competitor Howard Wilcox of Indianapolis over the last 75 miles in front of a packed crowd of 155,000 spectators to win the victory in a race in which only 10 of 40 starting cars managed to finish. Frame took the lead in lap 157 and never relinquished the advantage.

Frame's winning average speed of 104.14 mph topped the previous course record of 101.13 mph, set by Peter DePaolo in his 1925 Memorial Day victory at the Indianapolis Motor Speedway. Frame became the third Indy 500 winner to win with an average speed of more than 100 mph.

Later life and career award
Frame's son Bob was killed at a sprint car race in Minnesota in 1947. Frame died of an apparent heart attack in April 1962 in Hayward, California, a city in Northern California's East Bay area that he moved to in 1950.

Fred Frame was inducted in the New England Auto Racers Hall of Fame in 2004.

Indy 500 results

Footnotes

1894 births
1962 deaths
People from Exeter, New Hampshire
Sportspeople from Rockingham County, New Hampshire
Racing drivers from Los Angeles
Indianapolis 500 drivers
Indianapolis 500 winners
Racing drivers from New Hampshire
AAA Championship Car drivers